Archithosia is a genus of moths in the subfamily Arctiinae. The genus was erected by Sven Jorgen R. Birket-Smith in 1965.

Species
 Archithosia chrysargyrea (Kiriakoff, 1963)
 Archithosia costimacula Mabille, 1878
 Archithosia discors Kiriakoff, 1958
 Archithosia duplicata Birket-Smith, 1965
 Archithosia flavifrontella Strand, 1912
 Archithosia gilvafrons Durante & Panzera, 2002
 Archithosia makomensis Strand, 1912
 Archithosia rhyparodactyla (Kiriakoff, 1963)
 Archithosia similis Birket-Smith, 1965
 Archithosia sordida Birket-Smith, 1965
 Archithosia tryphosa Kiriakoff, 1958

References

Lithosiini
Moth genera